Olavi Leimuvirta (born 26 November 1935) is a Finnish former gymnast who competed in the 1956 Summer Olympics and in the 1960 Summer Olympics.

References

1935 births
Living people
Finnish male artistic gymnasts
Olympic gymnasts of Finland
Gymnasts at the 1956 Summer Olympics
Gymnasts at the 1960 Summer Olympics
Olympic bronze medalists for Finland
Olympic medalists in gymnastics
Medalists at the 1956 Summer Olympics
20th-century Finnish people